Jörg Behler, Ph.D. (2004), Dr. habil. (2014), is a German chemist, who is active in the field of theoretical chemistry; he is a professor of the Ruhr University Bochum since November 2022.

Education 
Jörg Behler earned his bachelor's degree in Chemistry from 1995 to 2000 at University of Dortmund. He then completed his PhD with Karsten Reuter and Matthias Scheffler at the Fritz Haber Institute of the Max Planck Society with a thesis entitled "Dissociation of Oxygen Molecules on the Al(111) Surface". He went on to a postdoc at ETH Zurich with Michele Parrinello, before being hired at Ruhr University Bochum as a research associate, then head of a junior research group. In 2017, Behler moved to the University of Göttingen as a Full Professor of Theoretical Chemistry. In November 2022 he returned to Ruhr University Bochum.

Awards 
 Otto Hahn Medal – Max-Planck-Society (2005);
 Hans G. A. Hellmann Award – Arbeitsgemeinschaft für Theoretische Chemie (2013).

See also 
 Stefan Grimme
 Roman M. Balabin
 Martin A. Suhm

References

External links 
 James Sudlow: Clever computers find solutions to NaOH structural puzzle // Chemistry World, 24 November 2016.

Living people
21st-century German chemists
Academic staff of the University of Göttingen
Year of birth missing (living people)